Antoni Bou i Mena (born 17 October 1986) is a Spanish professional motorcycle trials rider. He has been the sole outdoor and indoor FIM Trial World Championship champion from 2007 to 2022. With these 32 world titles (16 outdoor and 16 indoor), he is the most successful rider in history, surpassing Dougie Lampkin (7 outdoor and 5 indoor) and Jordi Tarrés who is third with 7 outdoor titles. At the age of 20 years and 5 months, Bou was the second youngest rider ever to win the World Indoor Title, and the youngest to do it on a 4-stroke motorbike.

Biography

Toni Bou's first race win was in 1999, when he obtained the Catalan Cadet Trials Championship title at the age of 12. In 2001 he was the Spanish Junior Trials Champion. His World Trials debut was a 2003 appearance in Bangor, Ireland, he ended the season 13th in the World Outdoor Trials Championship, and 1st in the European Outdoor Trials Championship. His first World Trials win was in 2006 when he ended 5th in the outdoor championship, and 3rd in the indoor one. In the same year he was the Spanish Outdoor Trials Champion.

In 2007 he was World Trials Champion for the first time, both in the indoor and outdoor Championships. He repeated this feat every year from 2008 to 2021.

In terms of National Team achievements, he has been part of the Spanish team, that obtained Trial des Nations wins in the years 2005, 2006, 2007, 2008 and 2009. He also achieved the same in the indoor version of the competition in the years 2006, 2007 and 2008.

The 2009 season was a perfect one for him, achieving all his objectives, as he won all the major 5 titles, including the indoor and outdoor world titles, the indoor and outdoor Spanish titles, and the Trial des Nations title. This feat was only achieved once before, by Adam Raga in 2005.

At the end of the 2017 season Bou signed an extended contract that will keep him with the Repsol Honda team until the year 2021, another three years.

In 2018, whilst facing stiff competition from his fellow countrymen Jeroni Fajardo and Adam Raga, Bou once again retained both his indoor and outdoor World titles.

Toni Bou rides a Repsol Montesa HRC bike.

International Trials Championship Career

(*) Season still in progress.

World Indoor Trials Championship Career

(*) Season still in progress.

(**) Worst result discounted.

Honours
 Spanish Trials Champion 2006, 2009, 2011, 2012, 2013, 2014, 2015, 2016, 2017, 2018, 2019
 Spanish Indoor Trials Champion 2008, 2009, 2010, 2011, 2012, 2013, 2014, 2015, 2016, 2017, 2018
 FIM European youth cup Champion 2002
 FIM European Trials Champion 2003
 FIM World Trials Champion 2007, 2008, 2009, 2010, 2011, 2012, 2013, 2014, 2015, 2016, 2017, 2018, 2019, 2020, 2021, 2022
 FIM World Indoor Trials Champion 2007, 2008, 2009, 2010, 2011, 2012, 2013, 2014, 2015, 2016, 2017, 2018, 2019, 2020, 2021, 2022
 Member of Spanish Trial des Nations winning team 2005, 2006, 2007, 2008, 2009, 2010, 2011, 2012, 2013, 2014, 2015, 2016, 2017, 2018, 2019, 2021
 Member of Spanish Indoor Trial des Nations winning team 2006, 2007, 2008, 2009, 2010, 2011, 2012, 2014, 2015, 2016, 2017, 2018, 2019

References

External links

 
 
 Toni Bou at Facebook
 Toni Bou profile, at HondaRacing

1986 births
Living people
Spanish motorcycle racers
Motorcycle racers from Catalonia
Motorcycle trials riders
People from Anoia
Sportspeople from the Province of Barcelona